Anna Aleksandrovna Krivshina (born 15 May 1996) is a Russian Paralympic swimmer. At the 2020 Summer Paralympics, she won a gold medal in the mixed 4 × 100 metre freestyle relay 49pts event and a silver medal in the women's 50 m freestyle S13 event.

Biography
Krivshina took up swimming at the age of 12. Her first coach was Yuri Mikhailovich Sereda, although she also considers her mother, a former competitive swimmer, as her first coach. In 2012, her new coach became Igor Lvovich Tveriakov, with whom she won the 2013 World Championships with a World Record.

Krivshina attends the Bashkir State Pedagogical University, where she is studying physical culture. However, in the future she wants to be a TV presenter.

Krivshina has a visual impairment. She can't see with her left eye, and has a low vision on her right eye.

References

External links
 

1995 births
Living people
Russian female freestyle swimmers
Paralympic swimmers of Russia
Paralympic gold medalists for the Russian Paralympic Committee athletes
Paralympic silver medalists for the Russian Paralympic Committee athletes
Paralympic medalists in swimming
Swimmers at the 2020 Summer Paralympics
Medalists at the 2020 Summer Paralympics
Russian female backstroke swimmers
S12-classified Paralympic swimmers
People from Ozyorsk, Chelyabinsk Oblast
Sportspeople from Chelyabinsk Oblast
20th-century Russian women
21st-century Russian women